Adams County Courthouse is located in the city of Decatur, the county seat of Adams County, Indiana. It was built in 1872–1873 at a cost of $78,979. The designer was J. C. Johnson, who had been trained as a carpenter and joiner and became a self-taught architect; he won second place in the Indiana State Capitol design competition.

Construction 
The construction was done by Christian Boseker of Fort Wayne.  It is built of red brick with stone ornamentation.

The building and three associated objects was listed on the National Register of Historic Places on September 17, 2008.  Included in the NRHP listing are:

Peace Monument, a limestone statue of a female figure
Elephant Rock, a memorial to author Gene Stratton-Porter, consisting of a gneiss glacial boulder with a bronze plaque
Pioneer Memorial, a bronze plaque and stand, from 1936

Featured property
It is the 12th property listed as a featured property of the week in a program of the National Park Service that began in July, 2008.

Notes

References

External links

Photographs of the Adams County Courthouse from the Ball State University Digital Media Repository

Courthouses on the National Register of Historic Places in Indiana
County courthouses in Indiana
Government buildings completed in 1873
Second Empire architecture in Indiana
Buildings and structures in Adams County, Indiana
Clock towers in Indiana
National Register of Historic Places in Adams County, Indiana
1873 establishments in Indiana